Iris Burgoyne (born Yumadoo Kochallalya) was a South Australian author and Kokatha (Aboriginal) elder who spent many years on the native title advisory council.

She was inaugural chairwoman for the Port Lincoln Aboriginal Health Service.

She was born in 1936 at Koonibba Mission on the western Eyre Peninsula and after resettling and fostering many youth she died in 2014 in Port Lincoln.

Bibliography

Personal
Her grandson Shaun Burgoyne is a feted AFL footballer and another grandson, Peter Burgoyne, is a former AFL player.

Notes

Indigenous Australian writers
Writers from South Australia
Australian women writers
1936 births
2014 deaths